The Natividad de la Nuestra Señora Parish (also Our Lady's Nativity Parish) commonly known as Pangil Church is a Roman Catholic church in Natividad, Pangil, Laguna, Philippines. The statue of the pregnant Virgin Mary (locally known as Nuestra Señora de la O) is said to be a gift from King Carlos III of Spain.

History
Pangil was founded as a visita or hermitage by Franciscan  friars Juan de Plasencia and Diego de Oropesa in 1579. It was administered by the nearby parish of Lumban due to lack of priests. The first church dedicated to the Nativity of the Blessed Virgin Mary was built out of cane. In 1611, a stone church and convent was built under the direction of Father Gonzalo del Roble. Restoration of the church's woodwork and improvement of the convent was done by Father Lucas Fernandez in 1711. The church was remodeled in 1749 to 1751 by Father Luis de Nambroca. Based on the records of Father Felix Huerta, the church has also a stone chapel dedicated to Saint Mark the Evangelist and Saint Anthony Abad.

Notes

Bibliography

External links 
 
 Facebook page of Our Lady's Nativity Parish

Pangil
Spanish Colonial architecture in the Philippines
Churches in the Roman Catholic Diocese of San Pablo